Ramon Riu i Cabanes (17 June 1852 – 27 December 1901) was Bishop of Urgell and ex officio Co-Prince of Andorra in 1901. Born in 1852 in Solsona he was appointed Apostolic Administrator of the Diocese of Solsona and Titular Bishop of Tamasus in 1895. In April 1901 he succeeded Salvador Casañas y Pagés as Bishop of Urgell and ecclesiastical Co-Prince of Andorra, he died however just few months after taking office.

External links
 Catholic-Hierarchy

1852 births
1901 deaths
20th-century Princes of Andorra
Bishops of Urgell
19th-century Roman Catholic bishops in Spain
20th-century Roman Catholic bishops in Spain